Sigurd Eek (3 October 1903 – 31 December 1977) was a Norwegian footballer. He played in one match for the Norway national football team in 1924.

References

External links
 

1903 births
1977 deaths
Norwegian footballers
Norway international footballers
Sportspeople from Skien
Association football midfielders
Odds BK players